Gandhi Before India is a 2013 book by the Indian historian Ramachandra Guha, the first part of a planned two-volume biography of Mohandas Karamchand Gandhi. The book deals with Gandhi's life up to his return to India following a 21-year period as a lawyer and civil-rights activist in South Africa. During this period in South Africa, Gandhi experienced discrimination that all coloured people there faced, including the Indian community he became a part of. In response to the government's policies he developed Satyagraha, a form of protest that translates loosely to "truth force".

Gandhi Before India was first published by Penguin India on 2 October 2013, Gandhi's birth anniversary. The book's title alludes to Guha's India After Gandhi (2007). Gandhi Before India was mostly well received by critics, both in the mainstream media and in scholarly journals.

Translations
Gandhi Indiaku munp (literally meaning Gandhi Before India) is the Malayalam translation of this book. The Malayalam translation has been released by DC Books.

See also
 Gandhi: The Years That Changed the World, Guha's 2018 sequel

References

External links
Gandhi Before India at Penguin India
Gandhi Before India at Random House

2013 non-fiction books
Biographies about politicians
Indian biographies
Books about Mahatma Gandhi
Penguin Books India books
21st-century Indian books